Monica Cecilia Abbott (born July 28, 1985) is a retired American professional softball player. Abbott was an All-American pitcher for the Tennessee Lady Volunteers in college before starting a professional career in the NPF and in the Japan Softball League. In international competition, she has played for Team USA from 2005 including the national softball team winning a silver medal at the 2008 and 2020 Summer Olympics. Abbott is the NCAA Division I leader in wins, strikeouts, shutouts and innings.

Early life and education 
Abbott was born in Santa Cruz, California and grew up in Salinas, California. Abbott attended North Salinas High School from 1999 to 2003; her parents are Bruce and Julie Abbott, and her siblings are Jessica (born 1984), Jared (born 1988) and twins Bina and Gina (born 1991).

While at North Salinas, Abbott led the Vikings to three CIF Central Coast Section Division I titles, averaging more than 300 strikeouts per season.

Abbott won the Cal-Hi Softball Athlete of the Year, the Sports Focus Athlete of the Year, the state's large school Player of the Year, and the MVP trophies from her high school, conference, county and section. She was also a two-time recipient of The Salinas Californian Athlete of the Year.

University of Tennessee
Much sought after by many colleges, Abbott decided to go to the University of Tennessee, with their treatment of female athletes an influencing factor. 
Abbott pitched for the University of Tennessee Lady Volunteers softball team from 2004 to 2007 and majored in communications.

Freshman 
Abbott became Tennessee's first All-American when selected as a Louisville Slugger/NFCA First Team All-American. In 59 appearances, Abbott was 45–10, compiled a 1.03 earned run average with 44 complete games and 24 solo shutouts, four no-hitters and a perfect game. She struck out 582 batters in 352 innings. Following the season she was named SEC Freshman of the Year. Abbott became the third pitcher in NCAA history to notch 500 strikeouts in a season.

Sophomore 
Abbott  became a two-time first-team Louisville Slugger/NFCA All-American and All-South Region selection after going 50–9 with a 0.52 ERA in 392.0 IP.
She broke her own record for single season wins with 50 and had 603 strikeouts thus becoming the first pitcher in NCAA Division I history to record 500 strikeouts in a season twice in her career. She helped lead UT to its first WCWS and was named to the WCWS All-Tourney team.

Junior 
Once again, Abbott was chosen as a first-team Louisville Slugger/NFCA All-American as well as a first-team All-South Region choice.
She led UT to the WCWS and was chosen as WCWS All-Tournament.
Abbott's 531 strikeouts made an unprecedented third year in a row of over 500.

Senior 
Abbott struck out  an NCAA Single Season current Record of 724 batters.  
She had 23 no-hitters and six perfect games and was named the 2007 USA Softball Collegiate Player of the Year and the Women's Sports Foundation Sportswoman of the Year award for Team Sports athletes.  She also was the 2007 Honda Award Winner.

She guided UT to its first SEC title and a berth in the CWS championship, where they lost to top-ranked Arizona in the best-of-three series final. Once again she was named to the all-tournament team.

Legacy 
Abbott set career and single season NCAA records her senior season with 189 victories, 2,440 strikeouts, 112 shutouts, 253 appearances and 1,448.0 innings pitched. She set a Single Season Record in Strikeouts of 724. 
Abbott was the first pitcher in NCAA Division I history to record 500 strikeouts in all four years of her collegiate career. 
She was inducted in the Tennessee Athletics hall of fame.  
She was Tennessee's first softball All-American in school history and was named to the All-Women's College World Series team three times.

US National Team 
Abbott enjoyed tremendous success internationally between 2005 and 2010.  She led Team USA to four World Cup of Softball championships, three Canada Cup titles, and gold medals at both the 2006 and 2010 ISF Women's World Championships.  Abbott pitched the United States to a gold medal at the 2007 Pan Am Games in Rio.   Abbott stepped down from the US Softball National Team in 2010 but returned in 2018 where she helped the USA win another World Championship.  She was also a member of the team that won the 2018, 2019 USA Softball International Cup, 2018 & 2019 Japan Cup and 2019 Pan Am Games.

2008 Olympics 
Abbott was selected for the final 15-person Olympic squad as one of three pitchers. On August 11, 2008, Abbott made her Olympic debut for Team USA, pitching the final inning against Venezuela. Abbott then pitched a 5 inning perfect game, striking out 8, as Team USA defeated the Netherlands 8–0. This was the first perfect game pitched in the Olympics.

In pool play, Abbott pitched the US to a 7–0 victory against Japan. She then pitched against them in the sem-final securing the 4–1 win and  USA's place in the gold medal game.

Team USA met Japan in the gold medal game and lost 3–1. Abbott pitched the final two innings.>   She finished the Olympics with a 0.29 ERA and a 3–0 record in 24 innings pitched while striking out 32 batters.

2020 Olympics 
Abbott agreed to be a part of the Olympic squad,  softball's first appearance at the Olympics since 2008.  The Olympics were postponed to 2021 as a result of the COVID-19 pandemic.

Abbott started in three matches for Team USA in the 2020 Summer Olympics group stage against Canada, Australia, and Japan. In addition, she came in as the relief pitcher for group stage matches against Italy and Mexico as well as in the gold medal match against Japan. She pitched 20.1 innings with 31 strikeouts, 7 hits, and a 0.00 ERA. Team USA lost to Japan 2–0 in the gold medal match and Abbott earned a silver medal along with the rest of the team. Following the tournament, she was named onto the WBSC All-Olympic softball team.

Professional career 
Abbott has been a member of five winning NPF teams, being named MVP in all those championships. She was also a NPF runner-up in 2009 and 2013.

NPF
Abbott debuted in the NPF on August 2, 2007, by striking out a career best 18 batters in a 10-inning victory against the Rockford Thunder. They won the 2007 NPF Championship, vs Rockford when Abbott threw a no hitter in the final.

In 2009 she played for the USSSA Pride as a runner up and in 2010 was traded to the Tennessee Diamonds.   She signed as a free agent  with the Chicago Bandits from 2011 to 2015.  
On July 23, 2015, Abbott pitched her second perfect game as a member of the Chicago Bandits, beating the Dallas Charge, 10–0.
In May 2016, the Scrap Yard Dawgs, a National Pro Fastpitch team, signed Abbott to a six-year contract, believed to be worth $1 million and the highest salary paid by a professional women's sports team in the United States.

For her career she is the most decorated pitcher in the league history with five Pitcher of The Year awards and 9 All-NPF Team selections. Currently, she also holds the career wins and strikeouts crowns (the second pitcher to achieve each milestone and the only to have both) along with the no-hitters (6), shutouts record (also the only pitcher to cross the 40 and 50 total). She also ranks top-10 in ERA, WHIP, innings and strikeout ratio (10.1).

Japan Softball League 

In 2010, Abbott joined the Japan Softball League (JSL). In her first season abroad, she led the circuit in strikeouts, ERA and was named league MVP while leading her Toyota team to the Japan Softball League title.    She pitched a perfect game in the final, then threw a no-hitter in the championship game the following year to lead Toyota to back-to-back titles. Toyota went on to threepeat for the JSL titles in 2010, 2011, 2012.   
They also won titles in 2014,  2016, & 2018  
She was a 5x MVP winning in 2010, 2011, 2012, 2016, 2018)  
As of 2020, she is in her 11th season.

Miscellaneous 
Abbott always wears Number 14.
At UT she wore #7 and it was retired by UT.  
  
Abbott founded the Monica Abbott Scholarship fund to support the education of female multi-sport athletes who demonstrate leadership both in the classroom and on the field. In addition, she hosts clinics with young softball players across the United States. Abbott hosts about 16 different instructional clinics for children under the age of 18 each year. As demand for more clinics has gotten stronger, Abbott is planning to introduce an online academy to help her reach more youth. The academy will feature video tutorials that go in-depth into the three focuses of Abbott's pitching style: rise ball, power pitching, and basic mechanics and leg drive.

Her fans are called Moniacs.

Career records
Abbott is simultaneously the NCAA Division I leader in Victories (189), Shutouts (112), Strikeouts (2,440), Single-Season Strikeouts (724) and innings pitched. During her senior season in college, she set the record for the most strikeouts in a Division I softball season.

She also holds the career records in wins, strikeouts, no hitters and shutouts for the National Pro Fastpitch.

In Japan, Abbott was a 6-time champion and a 5-time MVP. She is currently a member of the independent "This is Us" team.

Abbott is in the Guinness Book of Records with the fastest softball pitch ever, reaching 77 miles per hour back on June 16, 2012, in a National Pro Fastpitch (NPF) game between Abbott's Chicago Bandits and the Carolina Diamonds.

Single-game accomplishments 
 NCAA Division I tied-2nd highest 7-inning strikeout total of all-time (20), set on March 26 of her freshman year vs Liberty University
 6 games of at least 17 strikeouts in a 7-inning game, a mark only accomplished 20 times in NCAA Division I history (including Abbott's performances)

Season accomplishments 
 2007 USA Softball Collegiate Player of the Year
 Only Player with more than one 50-win season in a career (2)
 Only Player with four seasons of 40+ wins in a career
 Only Player with four 500-strikeout seasons (and two 600-strikeout seasons) in a collegiate career
 Most strikeouts in a season (2007) – 724
 Most games pitched in a season (2005) – 69
 Most wins and most strikeouts in a season by a freshman (2004) – 45 wins and 582 strikeouts

Career accomplishments 
 2,440 career NCAA Division I strikeouts (1st all-time)
 189 career NCAA Division I wins (1st all-time)
 112 career shutouts (1st all-time)
 253 career games pitched (1st all-time)
 206 career games started (1st all-time)
 1448 career innings pitched (1st all-time)
 178 career complete games (2nd all-time)
 11.80 career strikeouts per 7 innings (3rd all-time)
 .848 career win percentage
 16 career saves (tied-10th all-time)
 23 career NCAA Division I no-hitters (2nd all-time)
 6 career NCAA Division I perfect games (2nd all-time)

Career highlights
 6× Japan Softball League Champion (2010, 2011, 2012, 2014, 2016, 2018)
 5× Japan Softball League MVP (2010, 2011, 2012, 2016, 2018)
 2008 Olympic Silver Medalist
 Pitched First Perfect Game in Olympic History
 3× World Champion Gold Medalist
 2× Pan American Gold Medalist
 5× National Pro Fastpitch Champion (2007, 2011, 2013, 2015, 2017)
 4× NPF MVP (2007, 2011, 2015, 2017)
 5× NPF Pitcher of the Year (2011, 2012, 2015, 2016, 2017)
 All-NPF Selection (2009, 2010, 2011, 2012, 2013, 2014, 2015, 2016, 2017)
 Women's Sports Foundation Sportswoman of the Year (2007)
 Honda Award Winner in Softball (2007)
 4× All-American
 First pitcher in D1 to record 500 Strikeouts all 4 seasons at the collegiate level.

Career statistics

References

External links 
 
 
 
 
 
 

1985 births
Living people
Chicago Bandits players
Competitors at the 2022 World Games
World Games gold medalists
World Games medalists in softball
Medalists at the 2007 Pan American Games
Medalists at the 2008 Summer Olympics
Medalists at the 2019 Pan American Games
Medalists at the 2020 Summer Olympics
Olympic silver medalists for the United States in softball
Olympic softball players of the United States
Pan American Games gold medalists for the United States
Pan American Games medalists in softball
Scrap Yard Dawgs players
Softball players at the 2007 Pan American Games
Softball players at the 2008 Summer Olympics
Softball players at the 2020 Summer Olympics
Softball players from California
Sportspeople from Salinas, California
Sportspeople from Santa Cruz, California
Tennessee Volunteers softball players
American expatriate sportspeople in Japan